MTV Unplugged: Comfort y Música Para Volar (Spanish for Comfort and music to fly) is a part-live, part-studio album recorded by Argentine rock band Soda Stereo. The first seven tracks were recorded live at MTV Studios in Miami, Florida, for the show MTV Unplugged. The remaining four tracks were Sueño Stereo outtakes recorded in studio. The album was released by BMG Argentina in 1996. It was also the first Latin band to depart from the use of only acoustic instruments, using for most of the televised set conventional "plugged" instruments. Proof of this paradox is the fading "Un" part of the word unplugged depicted in the album cover.

Track listing
 En la Ciudad de la Furia (feat. Andrea Echeverri) (At the City of Fury)
 Un misil en mi placard (A missile in my closet)
 Pasos (Steps)
 Entre caníbales (Among cannibals)
 Té para 3 (Tea for 3)
 Ángel eléctrico (Electric Angel)
 Ella usó mi cabeza como un revólver (She used my head like a revolver)
 Sonoman (banda de sonido)
 Planeador (Planner)
 Coral
 Superstar

2007 Release
October 2007 saw the re-release of Comfort y Música Para Volar in both CD and DVD formats, featuring the complete MTV performance on audio and video respectively but without the Sueño Stereo outtakes included in the original release. The new tracks include the cover of Vox Dei's song Genesis, which aired on the MTV network but was not included on the first edition. 
Un misil en mi placard
En la ciudad de la furia
Entre caníbales
Pasos
Zoom
Cuando pase el temblor
Té para 3
Ángel eléctrico
Terapia de amor intensiva
Disco eterno
Ella usó mi cabeza como un revólver
Paseando por Roma
Génesis

Personnel
Soda Stereo
 Gustavo Cerati: lead vocals and backing vocals, guitars
 Zeta Bosio: bass, electric-acoustic guitar and backing vocals
 Charly Alberti: hybrid drums

Additional personnel
 Tweety González: synthesizers, electric piano and sampler 
 Pedro Fainguersch: viola
 Diego Fainguersch: cello
 Ezequiel Fainguersch: bassoon
 Andrea Echeverri: backing vocals on "En la ciudad de la furia"
 Iain Baker: synthesizers in track 8

Certifications

References

Soda Stereo albums
MTV Unplugged albums
1996 live albums
Sony Music Argentina albums
Spanish-language live albums